The Brand New Heavies is the debut album by British acid jazz and funk group The Brand New Heavies.

Original release (UK only) 

After signing with Acid Jazz, the band released "People Get Ready" as a vinyl single backed with "Gimme One Of Those". Their next release, in 1990, was the single "Dream Come True" featuring Jay Williamson, then known as Jay Ella Ruth, on vocals. The same year, the band released their self-titled debut on Acid Jazz Records in a largely instrumental version. An expanded edition of this version of the album was released through BGP Records in 2007, featuring tracks previously included on “Original Flava”.

Track listing

North American version 

The 1991 US release of The Brand New Heavies on Delicious Vinyl Records reached #17 on the Billboard R&B Album charts. The release brought the band to prominence with the success of the singles "Never Stop" and "Dream Come True." The former of the two reached #3 on the US Billboard R&B singles chart. Much of their success was due in part to singer N'Dea Davenport's charismatic vocal performance and stage presence. Davenport's version of "Stay This Way" was also released as a single and reached #19 on the Billboard R&B Singles chart.

Track listing

Re-release (International version) 

In 1992 the album was released in Europe and re-released in the UK. This version of the album is a modified version of the US version, likewise with N'Dea Davenport on vocals. It opens with a new, long mix of "Dream Come True". The Heavies' own remixes of "Stay This Way" and "Ride In The Sky" replace the US versions. The David Morales remix of "Never Stop", taken from the US single, is also included. The remix was released as single also in Europe on Acid Jazz, during the transition the Heavies moved from Acid Jazz to FFRR. The first fully FFRR Heavies release was "Ultimate Trunk Funk - The EP", with the same Morales mix of "Never Stop" as the lead track.

Though the instrumental "Shake Down" is left off, this version adds a cover of the 1978 Philly soul gem by Jean Carne, "Don't Let It Go To Your Head", also released as single in Europe. A new version of the Heavies' debut single "Got To Give" with new vocals by Davenport and Jan Kincaid closes the album. Though N'Dea was not originally a member of the group, by the time of this 1992 re-release she was shown on the cover of the album with the band and her own feature credit.

Track listing

Personnel
The Brand New Heavies
Simon Bartholomew – guitar, vocals
N'Dea Davenport (1991) – vocals
Lascelles Gordon (1991) – percussion, guitar
Jan Kincaid – drums, keyboards
Jay Ella Ruth (1990) – vocals
Andrew Levy – bass, keyboards, writer & producer
Jim Wellman (1991) – tenor saxophone, soprano saxophone, keyboards

References

The Brand New Heavies albums
1990 debut albums
Acid Jazz Records albums